Per-Olof Ericsson (born 4 April 1938) is a Swedish former swimmer. He competed in the men's 400 metre freestyle at the 1960 Summer Olympics.

References

External links
 

1938 births
Living people
Olympic swimmers of Sweden
Swimmers at the 1960 Summer Olympics
Swimmers from Stockholm
Swedish male freestyle swimmers